Galatasaray University is a Turkish university established in İstanbul, Turkey in 1992, following an agreement signed in the presence of President François Mitterrand of France and President Turgut Özal of Turkey during a ceremony at Galatasaray High School, the mother school of the university. Turkey's Ambassador to France, Coşkun Kırca, played an important role in organizing the agreement. Galatasaray University is one of the most important members of the Galatasaray Community as Galatasaray High School and Galatasaray Sports Club, and is widely regarded as one of the most prestigious and notable universities in Turkey.

The establishment has five faculties (Economic and Administrative Sciences, Law, Communications, Natural Sciences and Literature, Engineering and Technology); two institutes (Social Sciences, Applied Sciences), 200 teachers and 2500 students.

As a participant in the European exchange programs Erasmus and Socrates, Galatasaray University accommodates around 50 European students. Meanwhile, 100 students of Galatasaray University travel each year to France within the framework of these exchange programs.

In essence, Galatasaray University represents a secular tradition of teaching. Courses at Galatasaray University are tri-lingual: in Turkish, French and English. Apart from French which is the primary foreign language, fluency in English as the secondary foreign language is also required. Also, the students have to follow a third language course during their studies, which is either Spanish or German according to their choice. For the Faculty of Engineering, the preparatory period includes only one year of linguistic training.

Galatasaray University is located at Ortaköy within the borough of Beşiktaş, a populous central district on the European side of İstanbul. The building that accommodates Galatasaray University was originally the Feriye Palace, a coastal summer palace on the Bosphorus built in 1871.

Galatasaray University is heir to the centuries-old traditions of Galatasaray High School which was established in 1481 as the Galata Sarayı Enderun-u Hümayunu (Galata Palace Imperial School).

History
In 1871, during the reign of Sultan Abdülaziz, the building was built by Ottoman Armenian architect Sarkis Balyan. The building was used as a dormitory for the female students of the Galatasaray High School until 1992, when it was inaugurated as the Galatasaray University.

On January 22, 2013, the roof of a building used by professors and secretaries for offices caught on fire. The cause was assumed to be electrical, since a small outlet fire occurred at around 6:00 pm. After campus security stabilized the fire and disabled the alarm, the fire spread inside the walls of the building to the roof. The fire was contained at approximately 10:00 pm.

Organisation

Faculty of Arts and Sciences
Comparative Linguistics and Applied Languages
Mathematics
Philosophy
Sociology

Faculty of Communications

Faculty of Economics and Administrative Sciences
Economics
Business Administration
International Relations
Political Science

Faculty of Engineering & Technology
Computer Engineering
Industrial Engineering

Faculty of Law
The last student to be admitted to Galatasaray University Law School for 2016–2017 academic period, is the 87th of 2.255.386 (around %0,0044) students sorted by their score in ÖSYS (Central Exam for Student Selection and Placement for Higher Education). In 2019, still the students to be admitted to the Galatasaray University Law School are in the first 100 students sorted by their score of the  central exam. This highly selective process, coupled with the quality of the professors makes the Galatasaray University Law School one of the best law schools in Turkey. Galatasaray Law School ranks as the number one law school in Turkey almost every year.

Institutes offering graduate programs

Institute of Social Sciences

 International Relations Graduate Program
 Doctorate Program in Business Administration
 Business Administration M.A.B
 Business Administration Msc Marketing and Logistics
 Graduate Programme Without M.A.Thesis “Regional Strategic Studies”
 Public Law Phd Program
 Private Law Graduate Program
 Public Law Graduate Program
 MA in Communication Strategies and Public Relations
 Private Law Phd Program
 Philosophy Graduate Program
 Mass Media and Communication Graduate Program
 Philosophy Phd Program
 Sociological Studies on Turkey
 Economics Ph.D. Program

Institute of Sciences

 Industrial Engineering PhD Program
 Master of Science Program in Industrial Engineering
 Non-thesis Master of Science Program in Engineering Management
 Non-thesis Master of Science Program in Information Technologies
 Non-thesis Master of Science Program in Marketing Communications Management

Research centers

 Administration Research Center
 Penalty Law and Criminology Research Center
 Strategical Research Center
 Center of Research and Documentation of Europe
 Kemalist Reforms Research Center
 MEDIAR - Center for Media Studies, Research and Applications
 GİAM Galatasaray Center For Economic Research

See also 
 Galatasaray High School
 Galatasaray Sports Club
 Mustafa Cengiz

References

External links

 Galatasaray University homepage
 Galatasaray University on Wikimapia

 
1992 establishments in Turkey
France–Turkey relations
Bosphorus
Galatasaray S.K.
Beşiktaş
Educational institutions established in 1992